Acronicta brumosa, the charred dagger moth,  is a moth of the family Noctuidae. It is found from New York to Florida, west through the southern states to California, north at least to Utah.

The wingspan is about 38 mm.

The larvae feed on various Quercus species.

Subspecies
Acronicta brumosa brumosa
Acronicta brumosa persuasa
Acronicta brumosa liturata

External links
Bug Guide

Acronicta
Moths of North America
Moths described in 1852